Río Negro Airport is an airport serving Hornopirén, a village in the Los Lagos Region of Chile.

The airport and village are at the north end of a salt water inlet off the Gulf of Ancud, and approaches from the south are over the water. There is high and mountainous terrain in all quadrants.

See also

Transport in Chile
List of airports in Chile

References

External links
OpenStreetMap - Río Negro
OurAirports - Río Negro Airport
FallingRain - Río Negro Airport
HERE Maps - Río Negro

Airports in Chile
Airports in Los Lagos Region